Xagal  is a town in Berbera District, in the Sahil Region of Somaliland.

See also

References 

Populated places in Sahil, Somaliland